Lockhartia acuta is a species of orchid native to Costa Rica, Panama, Venezuela, Colombia and Trinidad.

References

acuta
Orchids of Central America
Orchids of South America
Flora of Trinidad and Tobago
Plants described in 1836
Flora without expected TNC conservation status